Jennifer Rauh  (born ) is a Canadian retired female volleyball player, who played as a wing spiker. 

She was part of the Canada women's national volleyball team at the 2002 FIVB Volleyball Women's World Championship in Germany. On club level she played with Herentals VBC.

Clubs
 Herentals VBC (2002)

References

1971 births
Living people
Canadian women's volleyball players
Place of birth missing (living people)
Wing spikers
UBC Thunderbirds women's volleyball players
Expatriate volleyball players in Belgium
Canadian expatriate sportspeople in Belgium